Joel Hurstfield (4 November 1911 – 29 November 1980) was a British historian of the Tudor period.

Early life and career
He was educated at Owen's School in Islington and University College London, where he obtained a first class honours degree. He also won the Pollard and Gladstone Prizes and studied under J. E. Neale. Hurstfield was lecturer at University College, Southampton from 1937 until 1940. He planned to stand for Parliament but his adoption as a parliamentary candidate was prevented by the outbreak of the Second World War. Hurstfield worked for the civil service during the war and contributed to a volume of the official history of the war, The Control of Raw Materials (1953).

In 1946 he was appointed a lecturer at London University and held a joint seminar on Tudor history with J. E. Neale at the Institute of Historical Research. In 1962 he succeeded M. A. Thomson as Astor Professor of English History at the University of London, which he held until 1979. Hurstfield was also Public Orator at London University from 1967 until 1971. In 1979 he became Senior Research Associate at Huntingdon.

Personal life
Hurstfield married Elizabeth Valmai Walters and they had one son and one daughter.

Works
The Queen's Wards: Wardship and Marriage under Elizabeth I (London: Longmans, Green & Co., 1958).
Elizabeth I and the Unity of England (London: The English Universities Press, 1960).
The Elizabethan Nation (London: BBC, 1964).
The Reformation Crisis (London: Edward Arnold, 1965).
Freedom, Corruption and Government in Elizabethan England (London: Jonathan Cape, 1970).
The Historical Association Book of the Tudors (London: Sidgwick and Jackson, 1973).
The Historian As Moralist: Reflections on the Study of Tudor England (London: Athlone Press, 1975).
The Illusion of Power in Tudor Politics (London: The Athlone Press, 1979).
Man as a Prisoner of His Past: The Elizabethan Experience (University of Wales Press, 1980).

Notes

1911 births
1980 deaths
People educated at Dame Alice Owen's School
Alumni of University College London
Academics of the University of Southampton
20th-century British civil servants
Academics of the University of London
Academics of the Institute of Historical Research